Gabriel Davidovich is the Ashkenazi Chief Rabbi of Argentina. He is based at the AMIA Jewish center, where he has led the community since 2013. In February 2019, he was violently assaulted in an anti-Semitic attack at his Buenos Aires home. The assailants broke nine of his ribs, affecting a lung, and left him disfigured. The attackers restrained his wife and took money before fleeing.

Investigators are examining whether the attack on Davidovich may have been ordered in revenge for a rabbinical ruling.

Buenos Aires Police have apprehended five suspects believed to be linked to the attack.

References

Living people
Year of birth missing (living people)
Place of birth missing (living people)
Chief rabbis
Argentine rabbis
Victims of antisemitic violence
Argentine victims of crime
People from Buenos Aires